Blood of the Fold is the third book in Terry Goodkind's epic fantasy series The Sword of Truth.

Plot introduction
Prior to the start of Blood of the Fold, Richard comes to terms with his true identity as a War Wizard, a powerful wizard with both additive and subtractive magic. The New World, and all the freedom of humankind, is under threat from the Imperial Order after the barrier between the Old and New World was brought down.  The Imperial Order has already sent delegations and armies into the New World. Richard's only option to stop the invasion is to claim his heritage and unite all free kingdoms and provinces under one rule and one command.

Plot summary
The story begins at the Palace of the Prophets where a funeral is being held for Nathan and Ann. Sister Verna and Warren, now freed from Rada'Han, are traveling with Richard to break down the barrier between the New and the Old World. Upon returning from the funeral, Sister Verna discovers that the ring of the Prelate is at the center of the large room, wrapped in a spell that does not allow any sister to retrieve it. The sisters invite Verna to make an attempt and she succeeds, becoming Ann's successor. Incredulous, Verna confides to Warren that she does not know what to do about the presence in the Palace of the Sisters of the Dark.

In the meantime, Richard suffers an attack by mriswiths at Aydindril but is saved by Gratch, who can sense the presence of the creatures. Realizing that they need allies, Richard decides to go to the embassy of D'Hara to claim the loyalty of the troops as the new Lord Rahl. On the way into town he gives a silver coin with the symbol of the Palace of the Prophets to a little girl who, with her grandmother, sells cakes with honey and is recognized by them as the Seeker. They promise not to reveal his identity. Shortly afterwards, Richard clashes with Blood of the Fold member Galtero, and is saved thanks to the intervention of four Mord-Sith: Cara, Raina, Berdine and Hally, and two personal guards of the Master Rahl, Ulic and Egan, who swear allegiance to him. Richard also learns from them the nature of the special bond that exists between Lord Rahl and all the D'Haran: a spell cast almost three thousand years ago by an ancestor of Richard, which involves a pact where the D'Haran protect Lord Rahl by force of arms and in return Lord Rahl protects all his subjects with the power of magic. The only requirement for the bond to work is that the D'Harans recognize the legitimacy of the title of Lord Rahl. Richard and his escort go to General Reibisch, the man in charge of the D'Haran army in Aydindril, in an effort to gain their loyalty. They succeed only through an attack of mriswith who burst into the room killing the Mord-Sith Hally, and several soldiers, which gives Richard the opportunity to kill the mriswith by dancing with the spirits, which convinces the D'Harans he is the real Lord Rahl. The general recognizes the authority of Lord Rahl, thus giving Richard control of the army.

At the Nicobarese's Palace in Aydindril, Lord General Tobias Brogan, assisted by his sister Lunetta, who through her gift is able to identify lies, investigates the death of the Mother Confessor. Among the ones being questioned is Sanderholt, the cook of the Confessors' Palace, whose lies are discovered by Lunetta who figures out that Kahlan is still alive. They also question the old lady and the little girl that Richard had previously bought cupcakes from, who demonstrate a knowledge of magic greater than expected. The old woman suggests that the Mother Confessor is alive and protected by a spell and she gives Brogan the money received from Richard telling him that in the city there is a magician powerful enough to cast a spell of that type. Brogan gives orders to his subordinates to question the two by all means to prove that they are servants of the Keeper. He then decides to go immediately in search of the Mother Confessor to kill her but is stopped by the words of his sister who explains that the spell that protects Kahlan probably makes sure that the Seeker can not recognize her. While deciding what to do, Brogan is summoned to the Confessors' Palace by the new Lord Rahl, along with all delegations in the Midlands. At the Confessors' Palace, Richard dissolves the Midlands giving everyone an ultimatum: either unite under D'Haran Empire willingly or be conquered. His words anger Duke and Duchess Lumholtz. Richard also announces that Galea has already joined the D'Haran Empire and he's going to marry their new queen, after which the assembly is dissolved with the caveat that none of the dignitaries will leave Aydindril until they surrender to D'Hara. Richard speaks to Brogan and his sister and demands they stop their interrogations that take place in the palace of the Nicobarese. Richard reiterates that the Mother Confessor is dead and emphasizes the fact that Nicobarese would do well to join D'Hara. Brogan gives his knife as a sign of confidence in Richard and asks for a silver coin in exchange. At the end of the meeting Richard sends Gratch to give a letter to Kahlan, describing his resolutions to dissolve the Midlands.

At the Palace of the Prophets, Verna and Warren go to visit sister Simona, a sister of the Light confined in the infirmary because she is considered crazy. She discovers that the Emperor Jagang, who is coming to visit in Tanimura, is the one in the ancient prophecies called the dreamwalker. She also realizes that there are many discrepancies in the circumstances that led to the death of Annalina and the Prophet Nathan. She decides to investigate.

Just out of the assembly, Tobias Brogan uses his sister to cast a circle spell on the Duke and Duchess Lumholtz, which would make them walk around a midden heap near the city. Brogan, Galtero and Lunetta wait by the midden heap until the couple shows up. Brogan greets the duchess warmly, wishing her a good evening but she ignores his greeting and walks right past him.

They wait until the duke and duchess show up again. This time, the duchess reacts with shock and asks Brogan to stop following her. She gets upset and closes her coat when she notices Galtero staring at her cleavage. The duke threatens to kill Galtero if he stares at his wife. Galtero just smiles without responding to the man. 

The third time the noble couple shows up, Duchess Lumholtz gets angry and insults Brogan. He snatches the lace at the bosom of her dress and rips open her dress down to her waist, exposing her breasts. Galtero pins her arms behind her back and forces her to arch her back. The duke tries to draw his sword but is frozen in place by Lunetta's magic. The duchess's nipples stand out stiff in the cold.

Brogan grabs the woman's left nipple, stretches it and cuts it off to give it to Lunetta, who uses it to cast a spell upon the young woman, making her obey Brogan. Under Brogan's orders, Lunetta heals Duchess Lumholtz left breast, leaving it without a nipple. Brogan then gives Duchess Lumholtz to Galtero, who rapes the woman on top of the midden. Brogan then kills the Duke and makes it look like a mriswith did it. After Galtero finishes raping the Duchess, Lunetta weaves another spell on her using the coin Richard gave, making her irresistible to Richard. Brogan also has the Duchess paint herself a nipple where her real one is missing. 

Brogan decides to run away from Aydindril to pursue the Mother Confessor because he sensed that she hides under the identity of the queen of Galea. He returns to the palace and discovers that the soldier to whom he had given orders to torture the old lady is dead and that she and the girl have fled. Brogan and Lunetta prepare to flee to chase the Mother Confessor but are attacked by D'Haran soldiers guarding the palace. They are rescued by the mriswith, who kill the soldiers. Galtero knocks down the Mord-Sith Berdine and Lunetta then casts the same spell on Berdine as she cast upon Duchess Lumholtz, binding her to Brogan's will as well.

Berdine then presents Duchess Lumholtz to Richard. He is so attracted to her that he doubts control of his own actions and agrees to let her stay in the palace as a guest and to protect her from the mriswith if she will surrender Kelton.

Meanwhile, Warren discovers that he is a prophet, and when pronounces his first prophecy, in which he speaks of a "false prelate" and the "end the Palace of the Prophets." Together, Verna and Warren decide to find out why gravediggers were hired at the Palace of the Prophets.

Richard, now under the spell surrounding the Duchess Cathryn Lumholtz, is able to organize and carry out the public ceremony in which Kelton surrenders totally to D'Hara.

Ulicia and five other Sisters of the Dark arrive at the residence of Emperor Jagang where they discover that a large number of Sisters of Light and Dark are Jagang's and that he has bent them to his will using his dreamwalking. Ulicia and the five sisters unite their Han to destroy him. The Emperor effortlessly defends against the Sisters' attack because he has already made them into slaves, promising them agony if they use magic without his direct order. He then hands the sisters over to a bunch of sailors to rape, save for Merissa who he keeps as his new favorite after he kills Christabel as an example.

At the Confessors' Palace, Richard manages to retire to his room for the night in an attempt to escape the tempting Duchess Lumholtz. Soon after she enters his room eager to have sex with him, Richard realizes that something is wrong and uses his magic to see the nature of the spell cast on the Duchess. He realizes that she is about to stab him and barely manages to escape the attack. A mriswith enters the room and cuts Cathryn in half, telling Richard that he came to save him because he is a "skin brother." Baffled, Richard observes that there is something strange about Cathryn's left breast. He licks his finger and erases the paint, making him realize that the nipple was missing. He senses that this is tied to the spell that changed the behavior of the now dead Duchess. He has Egin roll up Cathryn's corpse in a carpet and take it away. Lord Rahl calls the three Mord-Sith and orders them to take their tops off. This reveals that Berdine, the Mord-Sith who threatened him with Agiel the previous day, has the same mutilation. Trying to save Berdine, Richard lets her hit him with the Agiel in order to prove that the magical link with the House of Rahl is the most powerful spell. Because the magical bond with Lord Rahl prevents Berdine from killing Richard if he does not try to defend himself, the woman is eventually destroyed by the pain of magic and begs Richard to kill her. Instead he saves her which erases the possession spell. Stunned by Richard's altruistic behavior, the three Mord-Sith swear their loyalty again.

At Aydindril, Richard and Berdine enter the Wizard's Keep to search for anything that can help defeat the dreamwalker. Following the directions of a mriswith, they arrive in a room in which they find the mummified body of a magician and a diary. The two take the diary and return to the Confessors' Palace.

The Prelate Verna wakes up in a cell and learns from Sister Leoma that her imprisonment has a specific purpose: Emperor Jagang wants to find out if it is possible to break the magical bond that protects those who are faithful to the Lord Rahl. Sister Leoma has been authorized to torture Verna through the Rada-Han and to use her as a guinea pig.

Richard gets a visit from the commander-in-chief of the Kelton army who says he is very concerned about the fate of his country because the death of the Duchess Lumholtz could cause a bloody war of succession. The general asks Richard to appoint a king for the Keltons and he responds by choosing Kahlan as Queen of Kelton. To the astonishment of Richard, the general and the Mord-Sith knows that Kahlan is the Mother Confessor. Richard then realizes that the spell that protected Kahlan has dissolved. He decides to send his soldiers to look for her.

Kahlan and Adie are then taken to the Palace of the Prophets and locked in a room to await the arrival of Jagang. Meanwhile, Brogan begins to suspect that what is happening to the Palace of the Prophets does not follow the will of the Creator and he begins showing signs of mental imbalance.

Characters

Wizard's Third Rule
Blood of the Fold reveals the Wizard's Third Rule:

It is explained in the novel as follows: "Letting your emotions control your reason may cause trouble for yourself and those around you."

Reception
Booklist states that Blood of the Fold "boasts by far the most action--for the most part well done, whether with swords or sorcery--in any of the Sword installments to date."

References

External links
 Official Terry Goodkind website
 Unofficial Terry Goodkind website (endorsed by Terry Goodkind)

The Sword of Truth books
1996 American novels
1996 fantasy novels
American fantasy novels
Tor Books books